This is a list of notable musical acts who pertain to the glam rock genre of music.

Classic era of glam (1971–1976)

 ABBA
 Angel
 Arrows
 Barry Blue
 Bay City Rollers
 Be-Bop Deluxe
 Blackfoot Sue
 Marc Bolan
 David Bowie
 Chicory Tip
 City Boy
 Alice Cooper
 Jayne County
 The Darts
 Donovan (briefly in the early 1970s)
 Doctors of Madness
 Brian Eno
 David Essex
The Faces
 Bryan Ferry
 Fox
 Geordie
 The Glitter Band
 Gary Glitter
 Alex Harvey
 Heavy Metal Kids
 Hello
 The Hollywood Brats
 John Howard
 Ian Hunter
 Hush
 Iron Virgin 
 Japan
 Jet
 Jobriath
 Elton John
 Kenny
 Lemming
 Magic Tramps
 Ney Matogrosso	
Freddie Mercury
 Neil Merryweather
 Metro
 Milk 'N' Cookies
 Mott the Hoople
 Mud
 Ol' 55
 Paper Lace
 Pilot
 Iggy Pop
 Suzi Quatro 
 Queen
 Rabbit
 Racey
 Lou Reed
 Alastair Riddell
 Mick Ronson
 Roxy Music
 The Rubettes
 Sadistic Mika Band
 Sailor
 Secos & Molhados	
 The Sensational Alex Harvey Band
 Showaddywaddy
 Silverhead
 Skyhooks
 Slade
 Slik
 Brett Smiley
 Smokie
 Space Waltz
 Sparks
 Edy Star
 Alvin Stardust
 Steve Harley & Cockney Rebel
Rod Stewart
 Supernaut
 Sweeney Todd
 Sweet
 T.Rex
 The Tubes
 Magnus Uggla
 Vodka Collins
 The Walkers
 White Witch
 William Shakespeare
 Wizzard
 Roy Wood
 Zolar X

Post-1976 glam

  The Ark
The Cars
  The Darkness
  Doctor & The Medics
  Foxy Shazam
  Girl
 Hanoi Rocks
  Heavy Stereo
  Hot Leg
 Jetboy
  King Adora
Måneskin
Palaye Royale 
  Mikey Jukebox
  Negative
  Prima Donna
  Pure Rubbish	
 The Quireboys
  Marcus Reeves
  Robin Black and the I.R.S.
 Semi Precious Weapons
  Spacehog
  The Struts
 Suede
  Supergroupies
 T. Roth and Another Pretty Face
  Undercover Slut
 V Sparks
  We Are the Fury
  White Hot Odyssey
  Wig Wam
 Adam Lambert
 The Yellow Monkey
Alex Angel

Artists influenced by glam
While not true glam rock, these artists are heavily influenced by its musical/visual style.

 The 69 Eyes
Adam Ant
The Associates
 The Auteurs 
 Babymetal
 Bauhaus
Black Veil Brides
 Blondie
King Charles
 Cheap Trick
 Cinema Bizarre
 The Cure
Cyclefly
 The Damned
 Declan McKenna
 Def Leppard
 Denim
 Duran Duran
 Edguy
 Electric Light Orchestra
 Engine Alley
 Fakawi
 Falling in Reverse
 Fighter V
 Geisha
 Guns N' Roses
 Harlow
 Screamin Jay Hawkins
 HIM
 Hinder
 IAMX
 Michael Jackson
 Joan Jett
 Kesha
 Lacrimas Profundere (on last albums)
 Lady Gaga
 Lucius
 Lord of the Lost
 Lordi
 Manic Street Preachers
 Marilyn Manson
 Mansun
 The Mavis's
 Melody Club
 Janelle Monáe
 Mother Love Bone
 Mika
 Morrissey
 Mötley Crüe
 Muse
 My Chemical Romance
 Amanda Palmer
 Panic! at the Disco
 Kiss
 Placebo
 Poison
 Primal Scream
 The Runaways
 Prince
 Reckless Love
 Take That
 R.E.M. (Monster album)
REO Speedwagon
Scissor Sisters
 Little Richard
 The Smiths
Smashing Pumpkins
 Split Enz
 Steel Panther
 Tokio Hotel
 Twisted Sister
 W.A.S.P.
 Wrathchild
 X JAPAN

See also
Glam metal
List of glam metal bands and artists

References

General sources

External links
 Top 10 Glam Rocker Artists: Then and Now 

Glam rock

Glam